Scottish Livingstone Hospital, also known as Molepolole Hospital, is a government-run district hospital located in Molepolole, Botswana,  from Gaborone.

History

The hospital was built in 1933 by the United Free Church of Scotland. It opened the following year on 3 September, and Dr Sheppard was the first doctor. At the time, the hospital only held 20 beds.

Facilities
In order to combat the ongoing HIV/AIDS epidemic, the government opened a new hospital building in November 2007. The new building, built by Arup, hosts 350 beds and features high-tech heating and cooling systems.

The hospital houses an Infections Disease Care Clinic that offers antiretroviral therapy. Most of the doctors speak only English while the patients speak mostly Setswana. Thus, medical care is usually given through a translator. The number of doctors and amount of medical equipment is limited: There is only one x-ray machine and no radiologist. There are long wait times to see a doctor, and the obstetrics department is mostly run by midwives.

See also
 Alfred Merriweather

References

External links 
 Botswana Ministry of Health

1934 establishments in Bechuanaland Protectorate
Hospitals in Botswana
Hospitals established in 1934